Ali Changi (also Romanized as ‘Ālī Changī; also known as Ali Chagi and Ālī Jangī) is a village in Delvar Rural District, Delvar District, Tangestan County, Bushehr Province, Iran. At the 2016 census, its population was 693, in 205 families.

References 

Populated places in Tangestan County